Rat tail cactus is the common name for several members of the cactus family:

Disocactus flagelliformis (also Aporocactus flagelliformis)
Cylindropuntia leptocaulis
Cleistocactus winteri (Golden rat tail)